Kazem Khani may refer to:
 Kazem Khani-ye Olya
 Kazem Khani-ye Sofla